The Cass County Courthouse in Plattsmouth, Nebraska was built in 1891.  It was listed on the National Register of Historic Places in 1990.

It was designed by architect William Gray.  Built of brick, terra cotta, and stone, it is a two-story building,  in plan.  It has a tall central clock tower, and four corner towers, each with steep hipped roofs and elaborate ornamentation.

References

External links

Courthouses in Nebraska
National Register of Historic Places in Cass County, Nebraska
Romanesque Revival architecture in Nebraska
Buildings and structures completed in 1891